William Henry Stokesberry (30 March 1896 – 5 May 1981) was an Australian rules footballer.

Family
The son of the talented boxer, respected referee, and Richmond trainer, Joseph Allwood "Joe" Stokesberry (1872-1952), and Ellen "Nellie" Stokesberry (1875-1967), née Lewis, William Henry Stokesberry was born in West Melbourne, Victoria on 30 March 1896.

Football
Stokesberry played one match during the 1915 season for Richmond in the Victorian Football League:

He was a centre-half-forward whose only club game was as a last minute replacement when Richmond were short of players.

Footnotes

References
 Hogan P: The Tigers Of Old, Richmond FC, (Melbourne), 1996.

External links

1896 births
Richmond Football Club players
1981 deaths
Australian rules footballers from Melbourne
People from West Melbourne, Victoria